Renate Dannhauer-Borges (born 11 August 1939) is a German former cross-country skier. She competed at the 1960 Winter Olympics and the 1964 Winter Olympics.

Cross-country skiing results

Olympic Games

World Championships

References

External links
 

1939 births
Living people
German female cross-country skiers
Olympic cross-country skiers of the United Team of Germany
Cross-country skiers at the 1960 Winter Olympics
Cross-country skiers at the 1964 Winter Olympics
People from Oberwiesenthal
Sportspeople from Saxony